The 2020–21 season will be Al-Minaa's 45th season in the Iraqi Premier League, having featured in all 47 editions of the competition except two. Al-Minaa are participating in the Iraqi Premier League and the Iraq FA Cup.

Al-Mina'a will be looking to wrestle back the title they won in the 1977–78 season.

Review

Background
After the good level that the team showed in last season under the leadership of Valeriu Tița, who made the team top the league table after four rounds without losing, and had it not been for the cancellation of the league due to the COVID-19 pandemic, the team would have continued to make impressive performances, so the club management saw the need to renew the coach's contract and keep the players. Indeed, Tița's contract was renewed, and contracts renewed for most of the players of the previous season, also, good deals were added to the team, as the club signed the international player Emad Mohsin, the U-23 national team player, Abdul Abbas Ayad, and the U-20 national team player, Ali Shawqi. And the three foreign players were released, except for Abdoul Madjid Moumouni, who performed well, and three foreign professionals were signed, Senegalese Idrissa Niang, Ivorian Jean-Jacques Bougouhi, and Cameroonian Rostand Junior M'baï, as well as the Roman fitness coach Marius. It also appointed former player Rahim Bakr as a sports consultant within the technical staff. The league fixtures were released on 1 October, with Al-Minaa to kick off the new season home at Basra against Al-Hudood on 25 October.

Squad

Transfers

In

Out

Personnel

Technical staff
{| class="toccolours"
!bgcolor=silver|Position
!bgcolor=silver|Name
!bgcolor=silver|Nationality
|- bgcolor=#eeeeee
|Manager:||Ahmed Rahim||
|- 
|Goalkeeping coach:||Qusay Jabbar||
|- bgcolor=#eeeeee
| Fitness coach:||Ali Mohammed||
|-
| Team doctor:||Fares Abdullah||
|-bgcolor=#eeeeee
|Sport consultant:||Rahim Bakr||
|-
|Team supervisor:||Jihad Madlool||
|-
|Administrator:||Salah Khalil||
|-

Board members
{| class="toccolours"
!bgcolor=silver|Position
!bgcolor=silver|Name
!bgcolor=silver|Nationality
|-bgcolor=#eeeeee
|President:||Mohammad Jaber Al-Jaberi||
|-
|Secretary:||Taher Balas||
|-bgcolor=#eeeeee
|Treasurer:||Ali Kadhim Mubarak||
|-
|Member of the Board:||Nazar Taha Humoud||
|- bgcolor=#eeeeee
|Member of the Board:||Jihad Madlool Obaid||
|- 
|Member of the Board:||Ahmed Hamed Al-Jaberi||
|-bgcolor=#eeeeee
|Member of the Board:||Nabeel Abdul Ameer Jamil||
|- 
|Member of the Board:||Jalil Hanoon||
|- bgcolor=#eeeeee
|Member of the Board:||Hani Abed Waleed||
|-

Stadium
During the previous seasons, the stadium of Al-Mina'a was demolished. A company will build a new stadium that will be completed in March 2021. Since they can't play their games at Al Mina'a Stadium, they will be playing at Basra Sports City during this season.

Friendlies

Competitions

Overview

Premier League

League table

Summary table

Results by matchday

Matches

FA Cup

Squad statistics

Goalscorers

Last updated: 18 July 2021

Penalties

Overall statistics

Last updated: 18 July 2021

External links
 IPFL
 Results of Al-Minaa SC on a FIFA.COM 
 Iraqi League 2020/2021
 Al-Minaa SC: Transfers and News

References 

Al-Mina'a SC seasons